"I Kiss Your Lips" is a song by the German electronic dance music duo Tokyo Ghetto Pussy, an alias of Jam & Spoon. It was released in 1995 as the second single from their album, Disco 2001. The song charted in several countries, and was a success in Australia and the Netherlands, where it reached the top 10.

Track listing
 "I Kiss Your Lips" (Radio & Video Edit) - 3:52
 "I Kiss Your Lips" (Music for the Girlies Radio Edit) - 3:54
 "I Kiss Your Lips" (Club Mix) - 5:30
 "I Kiss Your Lips" (Music for the Girlies Extended) - 5:29
 "I Kiss Your Lips" (Groovecult's Mastertits Remix) - 7:03

Charts

Weekly charts

Year-end charts

Certifications

Yellow Claw version
On September 2, 2020, Dutch DJ trio Yellow Claw teamed up with Tokyo Ghetto Pussy to release a remastered version of the song.

References

1995 songs
1995 singles
Jam & Spoon songs
Songs about kissing